Iota Piscium (Iota Psc, ι Piscium, ι Psc) is single, F-type main-sequence star located 45 light years from Earth, in the constellation Pisces. Its spectral type is F7V, which means that it is somewhat larger and brighter than the Sun, but still within the range considered to have the potential for Earth-like planets. It has a surface temperature of about 6,000 to 7,500 K. Iota Piscium is suspected to be a variable star, and was once thought to have one or two stellar companions, but both are line-of-sight coincidences. It displays a far-infrared excess at a wavelength of 70μm, suggesting it is being orbited by a cold debris disk.

Naming

References

Pisces (constellation)
F-type main-sequence stars
Piscium, Iota
Piscium, Iota
Suspected variables
Double stars
Piscium, 017
116771
8969
222368
Durchmusterung objects